George Wyndham (1863–1913) was a British political figure and writer.

George Wyndham may also refer to:
George Wyndham, 3rd Earl of Egremont (1751–1837), English agriculturist, canal builder, art collector
George Wyndham, 4th Earl of Egremont (1786–1845), English nobleman and naval officer
George Wyndham, 1st Baron Leconfield (1787–1869), English soldier
George Wyndham (table tennis) (born 1990), Sierra Leonean table tennis player
George Wyndham (winemarker) (1801–1870), English-Australian farmer, wine-grower and pastoralist